Richard Mawarden (died c. 1418), of Marden, Herefordshire, Sodbury, Gloucestershire and Stratford-sub-Castle, Wiltshire, was an English politician.

He was a Member (MP) of the Parliament of England for Herefordshire in April 1384, for Wiltshire in January 1404 and for Gloucestershire in October 1404.

References

14th-century births
1418 deaths
English MPs April 1384
English MPs January 1404
People from Wiltshire
People from Herefordshire
People from Chipping Sodbury
English MPs October 1404